An Estonian Alien's Passport is a travel document that may be issued to a person who is stateless or of undefined citizenship residing in Estonia by the Police and Border Guard Board of the Ministry of Internal Affairs. It can also be used as an identity document. Estonia has about 80,000 to 90,000 alien's passports.

History

After independence in 1991, the Estonian government automatically granted Estonian citizenship to the persons who resided in the country before its annexation by the Soviet Union in 1940, as well as to their descendants. Those who could not prove that or arrived after 1940 and their children born in Estonia or elsewhere could acquire Estonian citizenship on condition that they be proficient in the Estonian language and know the country's history. But about 125,000 people (most but not all of whom were Russian speakers) who failed the tests or refused to take them have become stateless, or “non-citizens”, who hold a grey passport. Tens of thousands have opted for the red Russian passports proposed by Moscow. After a change in the law in 1995, all children born in Estonia after 1992 may obtain Estonian citizenship subject to certain conditions.

Identity information page

The Estonia Passport includes the following data:

 Photo of passport holder
 Type (P for ordinary passports)
 Code of Issuing State (EST)
 Passport No.
 Surname
 Given Names
 Date of Birth
 Personal No.
 Sex
 Place of Birth
 Date of Issue
 Authority
 Date of Expiry
 Holder's Signature

The information page ends with the Machine Readable Zone.

Visa requirements

The vast majority of nations which provide visa-free entry to Estonian citizens (those holding an Estonian passport) do not allow visa-free entry to holders of the Estonian alien's passport (who are not Estonian citizens).

Unlike Estonian citizens, holders of an Estonian alien's passport do not enjoy freedom of movement within the EU and the Schengen Area. They are allowed to stay in other Schengen Area countries for no more than 90 days in any 6-month period.

Moreover, holders of an Estonian alien's passport cannot legally work in other EU countries without a work permit.

See also
Estonian passport
Russians in Estonia
Non-citizens (Latvia)
E-residency of Estonia is a concept independent of nationality giving non-Estonian residents access to Estonian financial services.

References

Passports by country
International travel documents
Government of Estonia
Russians in Estonia